Dakar Dem Dikk Workers Democratic Union (Union démocratique des travailleurs de Dakar Dem Dikk, UDT-3D) is a trade union of employees of Dakar Dem Dikk (the public transportation network of Dakar, Senegal). The general secretary of UDT-3D is Mamadou Goudiaby, another important leader and negotiator of the union is Christian Salvy. UDT-3D is affiliated to CNTS/FC.

Trade unions in Senegal